Take Sides is a compilation cassette by Sneaky Feelings, released in 1985

Track listing
Side A
Not To Take Sides
Wouldn't Cry
Stranger Again
The Stranger And Conflicting Feelings Of Separation And Betrayal
Throwing Stones

Side B
Someone Else's Eyes
Everything I Want
Waiting For The Touchdown
Major Barbara
Won't Change
Husband House

Personnel
Kat Tyrie - bass guitar, synthesizer
Martin Durrant - drums, vocals, piano, synthesizer, percussion
Matthew Bannister - guitar, vocals, organ, piano, synthesizer, percussion
David Pine - guitar, vocals, percussion
John Kelcher - bass guitar, synthesizer, vocals, piano

References

1985 albums
Flying Nun Records albums
Sneaky Feelings albums